Georges Auguste Joseph Paillard (12 February 1904 – 22 April 1998) was a French cyclist. He won two UCI Motor-paced World Championships in the professionals division in 1929 and 1932 and finished in second place in 1930. Before turning professional in 1923 he competed in sprint at the 1920 Summer Olympics but failed to reach the finals. As a road cyclist, he won the races of Paris-Dieppe and Rouen-Le Havre in 1923 and Critérium des As in 1937.

On 29 March 1937 he set a world speed record at 137.404 km per hour behind a motorcycle pacer on the Autodrome de Linas-Montlhéry. In 1949, he set the hour record at 96.48 km.

References

1904 births
1998 deaths
French male cyclists
Olympic cyclists of France
Cyclists at the 1920 Summer Olympics
Sportspeople from Maine-et-Loire
UCI Track Cycling World Champions (men)
French track cyclists
Cyclists from Pays de la Loire